In constructive mathematics, the limited principle of omniscience (LPO) and the lesser limited principle of omniscience (LLPO) are axioms that are nonconstructive but are weaker than the full law of the excluded middle . The LPO and LLPO axioms are used to gauge the amount of nonconstructivity required for an argument, as in constructive reverse mathematics. They are also related to weak counterexamples in the sense of Brouwer.

Definitions 

The limited principle of omniscience states :

The lesser limited principle of omniscience states:

It can be proved constructively that the law of the excluded middle implies LPO, and LPO implies LLPO. However, none of these implications can be reversed in typical systems of constructive mathematics. 

The term "omniscience" comes from a thought experiment regarding how a mathematician might tell which of the two cases in the conclusion of LPO holds for a given sequence .

Analytic versions

Both principles have analogous properties of the real numbers.

References

External links 

 

Constructivism (mathematics)